Samuel Flake was an administrator of the English East India Company. He served as President of Bengal in the early eighteenth century.

References

Presidents of Bengal
English businesspeople
British East India Company people
18th-century British people